Tagetes hartwegii is a Mexican species of marigolds in the family Asteraceae.

It is endemic to the states of Jalisco and Nayarit in western Mexico.

Description
Tagetes hartwegii is a hairless perennial herb up to 90 cm (3 feet) tall. Stem is woody at the base. Leaves are bipinnate, up to 8 cm (3.2 inches) long.

Flower heads are yellow-orange, each containing 8 ray florets and 35-40 disc florets.

References

External links

hartwegii
Endemic flora of Mexico
Flora of Jalisco
Flora of Nayarit
Plants described in 1904